East Lutton is a hamlet in the Ryedale district of North Yorkshire, England. It is historically part of the East Riding of Yorkshire. The village lies in the Great Wold Valley and the course of the winterbourne stream the Gypsey Race passes through it.

East Lutton forms part of the civil parish of Luttons.

In 1823 East Lutton was in the parish of Weaverthorpe, the Wapentake of Buckrose, and the Liberty of St Peter's in the East Riding of Yorkshire. Population, including West Lutton was 311. East Lutton occupations included four farmers, a grocer & draper, a tailor, a shoemaker, and a corn miller.

References

External links

Villages in North Yorkshire